The 2005–06 Lega Basket Serie A season, known as the Serie A TIM for sponsorship reasons, was the 84th season of the Lega Basket Serie A, the highest professional basketball league in Italy.

The regular season ran from October 9, 2005 to May 2006, 18 teams played 34 games each. The top 8 teams made the play-offs whilst the lowest ranked team, Viola Reggio Calabria and the bankrupt club BT Roseto, were relegated to the Legadue.

Benetton Treviso won their second title by winning the playoff finals series against Climamio Bologna.

Regular Season 2005/06 

Teams marked in green qualified for the playoffs. Teams marked in red were relegated to Serie A2. BT Roseto team went bankrupt after the season, therefore Air Avellino was spared relegation.

Playoffs 

Quarterfinals

 Climamio Bologna - Angelico Biella 3-1 (78-67, 76-85, 105-55, 80-76)
 Benetton Treviso - Armani Jeans Milano 3-2 (83-76, 65-76, 77-70, 67-75, 81-66)
 Lottomatica Roma - Montepaschi Siena 3-1 (64-74, 84-60, 78-72, 84-63)
 Carpisa Napoli - Snaidero Udine 3-0 (107-87, 92-84, 91-72)

Semifinals

 Climamio Bologna - Carpisa Napoli 3-2 (91-89, 78-89, 83-58, 82-92, 103-83)
 Benetton Treviso - Lottomatica Roma 3-1 (85-77, 67-70, 63-55, 81-73)

Finals

 Benetton Treviso - Climamio Bologna 3-1 (77-69, 88-82, 72-73, 69-68)

Individual leaders 

Statistics are for the regular season.

Scoring

Assists

Rebounds

See also 
LBA

Lega Basket Serie A seasons
1
Italy